Christophe Deguerville (born 27 June 1970) is a French former professional footballer who played for AS Saint-Étienne (two spells), Lyon and SC Bastia.

External links
 

1970 births
Living people
People from Villeneuve-la-Garenne
Footballers from Hauts-de-Seine
Association football defenders
French footballers
AS Saint-Étienne players
Olympique Lyonnais players
SC Bastia players
Ligue 1 players
Ligue 2 players